The 60th National Film Awards ceremony was an event during which the Directorate of Film Festivals presented its annual National Film Awards to honour the best films of 2012 in the Indian cinema. The ceremony was held on 3 May 2013 and was hosted by Bollywood actors  R. Madhavan and Huma Qureshi.

Selection process 

The Directorate of Film Festivals invited nominations for the awards on 3 January 2013. Feature and Non-Feature Films certified by Central Board of Film Certification between 1 January 2012, and 31 December 2012, were eligible for the film award categories. Books, critical studies, reviews or articles on cinema published in Indian newspapers, magazines, and journals between 1 January 2012, and 31 December 2012, were eligible for the best writing on cinema section. Entries of dubbed, revised or copied versions of a film or translation, abridgements, edited or annotated works and reprints were ineligible for the awards. The deadline for submissions was 21 January 2013.

For the Feature and Non-Feature Films sections, films in any Indian language, shot on 16 mm, 35 mm, a wider film gauge or a digital format, and released in cinemas, on video or digital formats for home viewing were eligible. Films were required to be certified as a feature film, a featurette or a Documentary/Newsreel/Non-Fiction by the Central Board of Film Certification.

Dadasaheb Phalke Award 

Introduced in 1969, the Dadasaheb Phalke Award is the highest award given to recognise the contributions of film personalities towards the development of Indian cinema and for distinguished contributions to the medium, its growth and promotion. A committee consisting of five personalities from the Indian film industry was appointed to evaluate the Dadasaheb Phalke award nominations for 2012. Following were the jury members:

For the year 2012, the award was announced on 12 April 2013 to be presented to Pran, a veteran actor of Bollywood known for portraying various negative roles. He is also Padma Bhushan recipient of 2001.

Feature films 
A Hindi film, Dekh Indian Circus won the maximum number of awards (4) followed by Malayalam film Ustad Hotel, Hindi films Kahaani, Chittagong, Vicky Donor and Marathi film Dhag (3 awards each)

Jury 
For the Feature Film section, six committees were formed based on the different geographic regions in India. The two-tier evaluation process included a central committee and five regional committees. The central committee, headed by Basu Chatterjee, included the heads of each regional committee and five other jury members. At regional level, each committee consisted of one chief and four members. The chief and one non-chief member of each regional committee were selected from outside that geographic region. The table below names the jury members for the central and regional committees:

Central Jury

Northern Region: 

Eastern Region: 

Western Region: 

Southern Region I: 

Southern Region II:

All India Awards

Golden Lotus Award 
All the winners are awarded with a Swarna Kamal (Golden Lotus Award), a certificate and a cash prize.

Silver Lotus Award 

All the winners were awarded with a Rajat Kamal (Silver Lotus Award), a certificate and a cash prize.

Regional Awards 

National Film Awards are also given to the best films in the regional languages of India. Awards for the regional languages are categorised as per their mention in the Eighth schedule of the Constitution of India. Awardees included producers and directors of the film. No films in languages other than those specified in the Schedule VIII of the Constitution were eligible.

Best Feature Film in Each of the Language Other Than Those Specified In the Schedule VIII of the Constitution

Non-Feature Films

Jury 
A committee of seven, headed by chair, Aruna Raje Patil was appointed to evaluate the Non-Feature Films entries. The jury members were:

Golden Lotus Award 
All the winners were awarded with Swarna Kamal (Golden Lotus Award), a certificate and cash prize.

Silver Lotus Award 

All the winners were awarded with Rajat Kamal (Silver Lotus Award) and cash prize.

Best Writing on Cinema

Jury 
A committee of three, headed by Swapan Mullick was appointed to evaluate the nominations for the best writing on Indian cinema. The jury members were as follows:

The Best Writing on Cinema awards are intended to encourage the study and appreciation of cinema as an art form and the dissemination of information and critical appreciation of the medium through books, articles, reviews etc.

Golden Lotus Award 

All the winners were awarded with Swarna Kamal (Golden Lotus Award), cash prize and a certificate.

Special Mention 

All the award winners are awarded with Certificate of Merit.

References

External links 

Official websites

 Official Page for Directorate of Film Festivals, India
 60th National Film Award 2013 Ad Campaign
 Directorate of Film Festivals' Channel at YouTube (run by the Directorate of Film Festivals)
 National Film Awards Archives
 60th National Film Awards: Regulations for submission
 60th National Film Awards: Official Catalogue

Other resources
 National Film Awards at IMDb

National Film Awards (India) ceremonies
2013 Indian film awards